The Fujifilm X-A7 is an entry-level rangefinder-styled digital mirrorless camera announced by Fujifilm on September 12, 2019. The camera was available with a 15-45mm lens starting October 24, 2019.

The X-A7 is the latest release of the series.

Features 
The Fujifilm X-A7 is the successor of the X-A5, featuring a newly developed 24.2MP APS-C sensor. Unlike its predecessor, the new camera can record 4K videos in 30 fps. It uses copper wiring for high-speed data readout. The camera can take 440 frames per single charge. 

X-A7 is equipped with a larger flip-out articulating LCD touchscreen at 3.5 inches, a first from Fujifilm. Colors available for the camera are Silver, Camel, Mint Green and Dark Silver.

Key features 
 Newly developed 24.2 MP imaging sensor 
 23.5mm x 15.7mm CMOS sensor (APS-C)
 Enhanced face-detection and autofocus algorithms
 Touchscreen LCD flip-out articulating screen
 Video recording in 4K at 30fps
 Compact and lightweight at 320g (11.3oz)
 Bright Mode feature
 Eye detection
 4K Burst, 4K Multi Focus
 WiFi connectivity
 Bluetooth connectivity

References

External links 

 

X-A5
Cameras introduced in 2019